Phrissoma crispum is a species of beetle in the family Cerambycidae. It was described by Johan Christian Fabricius in 1776. It is known from South Africa.

References

Phrissomini
Beetles described in 1776
Taxa named by Johan Christian Fabricius